Last Child in the Woods: Saving Our Children From Nature-Deficit Disorder is a 2005 book by author Richard Louv that documents decreased exposure of children to nature in American society and how this "nature-deficit disorder" harms children and society. The author also suggests solutions to the problems he describes.  A revised and expanded edition was published in 2008.

Reception 
The book was on the New York Times best seller list for best paper nonfiction.  The author received the Audubon Medal "for sounding the alarm about the health and societal costs of children's isolation from the natural world—and for sparking a growing movement to remedy the problem."

Versions 
English: The Last Child in the Woods,
Hardcover (April 15, 2005), 
Paperback Updated and Expanded (April 10, 2008), 
audio CD: Recorded Books; Unabridged edition (December 20, 2007),

Children & Nature Network 
The success of Last Child in the Woods inspired the creation of Children & Nature Network co-founded and chaired by the book's author, Richard Louv,  to encourage and support the people and organizations working to reconnect children with nature.

Green Hour 
Green Hour is an organization that provides information on how to reverse Nature-Deficit Disorder, and encourages parents to let their children explore and reconnect with the outdoors.

See also
Nature Cat, a TV series inspired by the story

References

External links
 Official website for the book
 Today Show. July 16, 2008.
 Morning Edition, National Public Radio. May 25, 2005
 KQED. May 12, 2008

2005 non-fiction books
2005 in the environment
2008 in the environment
Environmental non-fiction books
Algonquin Books books
Biophilia hypothesis